The narrowmouth toad  is a genus of microhylid frogs found in the Americas between Honduras and the southern United States.

Narrowmouth toad may also refer to:

 Assam narrowmouth toad, a frog found in northeastern India
 Bicol narrowmouth toad, a frog endemic to the Philippines
 Kalinga narrowmouth toad, a frog endemic to the Philippines
 Painted narrowmouth toad, a frog endemic to the Philippines
 Philippine narrowmouth toad, a frog endemic to the Philippines

See also

 Narrow-mouthed toad (disambiguation)

Animal common name disambiguation pages